Pakistani Jews in Israel are immigrants and descendants of the immigrants of the Pakistani Jewish communities, who now reside within the state of Israel. They number between 1,000 and 2,000. The majority of these refugee Jews are those who migrated from Karachi, Sindh,  Pakistan to India and then many to Israel as part of the Jewish exodus from Arab and Muslim countries, and formed a small community in the city of Ramla. The Jews in Pakistan were mainly Sindhi Urdu Marathi-speaking Bene Israel.

History
Records cite that major Pakistani Jewish migration to Israel occurred in the 1960s and 1970s from India, where many Jewish refugees from Pakistan eventually settled during the independence period. Magain Shalome, built by Solomon David Umerdekar and his son Gershone Solomon, Karachi's last synagogue, was demolished in 1988 to make way for a shopping plaza. Most of the Karachi Jews now live in Ramla and Lod, Israel, Toronto, Canada, Mumbai, India and in several states in the United States and built a synagogue they named Magen Shalome.

Jewish immigrants from Pakistan have served with distinction in the Israel Defense Forces, helped revive the game of cricket in Israel and have added a fair amount of colour to Israeli society.

The Israeli authors, Yoel Reuben (Satamkar) and Eliaz Reuben-Dandeker are of Bene-Israel of Karachi descent.

Further reading
 "The Jews of Pakistan-A forgotten heritage", Yoel Reuben (Satamkar), Bene Israel heritage museum and genealogical research centre, 2010
 "So, what's your Kar-A journey into unknown India & Pakistan", Eliaz Reuben-Dandeker, Kammodan Mocadem Publishing house, 2018
 "The guide for the Bene Israel of India-culture, history and customs", Eliaz Reuben-Dandeker, Kammodan Mocadem Publishing house, 2019
 "The Jammaat-Inspiring people of the Bene Israel of India community, Eliaz Reuben-Dandeker, Kammodan Mocadem Publishing house, 2020

See also
 History of the Jews in Pakistan
 Aliyah
 Jewish ethnic divisions
 Bene Israel

References

External links
 In search of the Jews of Karachi
 
 

Asian-Jewish culture in Israel
Israeli Jews by national origin
Jewish Pakistani history
 
Israel